A list of films produced by the Bollywood film industry based in Mumbai in 1944:

Highest-grossing films
The seven highest-grossing films at the Indian Box Office in 1944:

A-C

D-K

L-M

N-R

S-Z

References

External links
 Bollywood films of 1944 at the Internet Movie Database

Listen to songs from Bollywood films of 1944

1944
Bollywood
Films, Bollywood